Capriccioso may refer to 

Rob Capriccioso
Pezzo Capriccioso (Tchaikovsky)
Introduction and Rondo Capriccioso by Camille Saint-Saëns

See also
Capriccio (music)